Neocrinus decorus is a species of crinoid in the family Isocrinidae. Neocrinus decorus has been around for 23.03 million years, and lives at depths from 154 to 1219 meters near the Caribbean of Venezuela, living on hard substrate.

Synonymised names 
Placed by the WoRMS.

 Chladocrinus decorus (Thomson, 1864) 
 Pentacrinus decorus Thomson, 1864

References 

Isocrinidae
Animals described in 1864
Fauna of the Caribbean
Invertebrates of Venezuela